Parasilaus is a genus of flowering plants belonging to the family Apiaceae.

Its native range is Central Asia to Afghanistan.

Species:

Parasilaus afghanicus 
Parasilaus asiaticus

References

Apioideae